Huang Shibo (Chinese: 黄世博; Pinyin: Huáng Shìbó; born 16 June 1987 in Xiamen) is a Chinese football player.

Club career
Huang Shibo was promoted to Chinese Super League side Xiamen Blue Lions's first team squad in 2006. He left the club in the middle of 2007 season due to dissatisfaction with low salary. He became a restaurant manager and played for the local amateur club Xiamen Dongyuhang between 2007 and 2010. In 2011, he signed a professional contract with the newly-founded Fujian Smart Hero, followed the club to move to Shijiazhuang in 2013 and finally returned to Chinese Super League in 2015 season. On 9 March 2015, he made his Super League debut in the season's first match which Shijiazhuang lost to Guangzhou Evergrande 2–1, coming on as a substitute for  Mao Jianqing in the 57th minute.

On 5 January 2017, Huang moved to League One side Hangzhou Greentown. He would make his debut on 8 April 2017 in a league game against Dalian Transcendence that ended in a 1-0 defeat. This would be followed by his first goal for the club on 19 April 2017 in a Chinese FA Cup game against Shenzhen Ledman F.C. that ended in a 1-0 victory. For several seasons he would establish himself as a regular within the team and would be part of the squad that gained promotion to the top tier at the end of the 2021 campaign.

Career statistics 
Statistics accurate as of match played 1 December 2022.

References

External links
 

1987 births
Living people
Chinese footballers
Footballers from Fujian
People from Xiamen
Association football midfielders
Chinese Super League players
China League One players
China League Two players
Cangzhou Mighty Lions F.C. players
Xiamen Blue Lions players
Zhejiang Professional F.C. players
21st-century Chinese people